

The Farman F.380 was a French single-seat racing monoplane designed and built by the Farman Aviation Works for air racing.

Development
The F.380 was a low-wing monoplane that first flew in 1933. It was similar but smaller than the contemporary F.370 and was powered by a 155 hp (116 kW) Renault Bengali inverted inline piston engine.  Like the F.370 it had streamlined features, including a shallow fin faired into the open cockpit headrest, but unlike the F.370 the F.380's single main wheel could be retracted and extended manually.  It was entered into the 1933 Coupe Deutsch de la Meurthe air race but the landing gear collapsed at the start of the race.  Despite this setback, before the race it had broken the class world speed record at 303.387 km/h over a 200 km course.

Specifications (F.380)

References

Notes

Bibliography

1930s French sport aircraft
F.380
Single-engined tractor aircraft
Low-wing aircraft
Aircraft first flown in 1933